Cecil Frederick Tate (1 May 1908 – 7 August 1997) was an English cricketer who played for Derbyshire in 1928 and for Warwickshire from 1931 to 1933.

Tate was born at Gillingham, Kent, the son of Fred Tate who represented England in one Test in 1902. His father became coach for Derbyshire and Tate played for Derbyshire in the 1928 season. His debut match was against Essex, when he made his top score of 21 in a drawn match. He played in another draw and two wins so he only played one innings in each match totalling 48 runs in the season. He took two wickets.

Tate did not play first-class cricket again until 1931, when he joined Warwickshire. He played 6 first-class matches in the season, and then played a last match in 1933. He batted at the tail end for Warwickshire and made fewer runs in 8 innings than he did in four for Derbyshire. However his bowling rating was higher. He also played for the second XI in those two years.

Tate was a right-handed batsman and played 12 innings in 11 first-class matches with an average of 9.11 and a top score of 21. He was a left-arm slow bowler and took 8 first-class wickets at an average of 51.12 and a best performance of 3 for 65.

Tate died at Burton upon Trent at the age of 89. His brother, Maurice Tate had an eleven-year Test career, along with 25 years of service at Sussex.

References

1908 births
1997 deaths
English cricketers
Derbyshire cricketers
Warwickshire cricketers